Mayana Kollai is a festival celebrated after Shivarathri on the first full moon day of February at the Angala Parameswari temples in Tamil Nadu, India. It is widely celebrated in the fishing communities as Angala Parameswari Amman is the deity worshiped by the fishermen.

History

References 

Tamil festivals
Festivals in Tamil Nadu
Festivals in India
Hindu festivals
Hindu festivals in India